Mikhail Vasilyevich Zhigalov (born May 2, 1942) is a Soviet and Russian actor of the Moscow Sovremennik Theatre and cinema. Honored Artist of the RSFSR (1991).

Biography 
Mikhail Zhigalov was born in Kuibyshev, Kuybyshevskaya oblast, Russian SFSR, Soviet Union (now Samara, Russia), which was evacuated mother of Mikhail during the Great Patriotic War. Father Mikhail Vasilyevich in 1938, he worked in the KGB (the Young Communist League was called on set). From evacuation Zhigalova family returned to Moscow.

After the war, his father Michael was sent to work in Czechoslovakia. Three years later Zhigalova returned to Moscow, where Mikhail tried to go to college. The first attempt did not turn success and he worked for a year at the plant, was secretary of the Komsomol organization of workshops. The following year he was able to enter the Moscow Institute of Chemical Engineering. While studying at the institute married.

In 1965 he graduated from the Institute Zhigalov, the distribution was in SRI, the laboratory filtration theory. Career began to emerge successfully, but when the opportunity came in the 10 months to go to England, to return from there to the final thesis, Mikhail refused the opportunities and resigned. His career has attracted the actor, and soon the young couple divorced.

In 1970 he graduated from Zhigalov drama studio at the Central Children's Theatre, where the actor worked until 1978, then went to the Sovremennik Theatre, where he created his major theatrical role.

In the film removed in 1972. He worked for more than a hundred movies.

Selected filmography
 1972 —  The Last Day as Lieutenant
 1975 —   For the Rest of His Life  as Lieutenant Commander without legs
 1977 —  On Thursday and Never Again as huntsman
 1979 —  Abduction Savoy as terrorist Magnus
 1980 —  Petrovka, 38
 1984 —  TASS Is Authorized to Declare... as auto mechanic Paramonov
 1986 —  To Award (Posthumously)
 1990 —  Vagrant Bus as Vasily
 1990 —  Stalin's Funeral as working
 1990 —  Afghan Breakdown as Colonel Leonid
 1991 —  Lost in Siberia as  leader of bitches
 2002 —  Brigada as Criminal authority Luka
 2013  / 15 —  The Junior Team as  Stepan Arkadevich Zharsky, coach
 2013 —   House with Lilies as Yegorych
 2023 —  Monsieur Constant of Alan Simon as Mischa Vodyanov

References

External links
 

1942 births
Living people
Soviet male film actors
Soviet male television actors
Soviet male stage actors
Russian male film actors
Russian male television actors
Russian male stage actors
20th-century Russian male actors
21st-century Russian male actors
Actors  from Samara, Russia
Honored Artists of the RSFSR